Swit may refer to:

Places 
 Świt, Gmina Cekcyn, a village in Gmina Cekcyn, Poland
 Świt, Gmina Gostycyn, a village in Gmina Gostycyn, Poland

Music 
 Świt, a song by Daria Zawiałow, Błażej Król and Igor Walaszek

As a surname 
 Loretta Swit, an American actress